Asif Šarić (born 15 January 1965) is a Bosnian football manager and former player who played as a midfielder. He was assistant coach for Hannover 96.

Football career
Šarić first played for Sloboda Tuzla and in 1992 he transferred to Germany to play for Arminia Bielefeld.

Šarić joined Basel's first team for their 1994–95 season under head coach Claude Andrey. Following their promotion in the previous season this was Basel's first season back in the highest tier of Swiss football. After playing in 8 test games Šarić played his domestic league debut for his new club in the away game in the Stade Olympique de la Pontaise on 3 August 1994 as Basel were defeated 2–1 by Lausanne-Sport. He scored his first goal for the club in the home game in the St. Jakob Stadium on 10 September. In fact he scored two goal as Basel won 4–0 against Luzern.

During his one season with the club, Šarić played a total of 39 games for Basel scoring a total of 4 goals. 21 of these games were in the Nationalliga A, three in the Swiss Cup and 15 were friendly games. He scored two goals in the domestic league, one in the cup and the other was scored during the test games.

Follow this year in Switzerland, Šarić return to Germany and played for Sportfreunde Siegen, SC Paderborn and SV Wilhelmshaven. He became assistant coach and reserve player for LR Ahlen in 2003. He was later assistant coach and then became head coach for Bonner SC in 2006. He was assistant coach for SC Paderborn between 2008 and 2011. In 2019 he was head coach ad interim for Hannover 96.

References

Sources
 Rotblau: Jahrbuch Saison 2017/2018. Publisher: FC Basel Marketing AG. 
 Die ersten 125 Jahre. Publisher: Josef Zindel im Friedrich Reinhardt Verlag, Basel. 
 Verein "Basler Fussballarchiv" Homepage

1965 births
Living people
Bosnia and Herzegovina emigrants to Germany
Association football midfielders
Bosnia and Herzegovina footballers
FK Sloboda Tuzla players
Arminia Bielefeld players
FC Basel players
Sportfreunde Siegen players
SC Paderborn 07 players
SV Wilhelmshaven players
Rot Weiss Ahlen players
Regionalliga players
Swiss Super League players
Oberliga (football) players
Bosnia and Herzegovina expatriate footballers
Expatriate footballers in Switzerland
Bosnia and Herzegovina expatriate sportspeople in Switzerland
Bosnia and Herzegovina football managers
Bonner SC managers
Hannover 96 non-playing staff
Hannover 96 managers
2. Bundesliga managers